The 3rd Secretariat of the Lao People's Revolutionary Party (LPRP), officially the Secretariat of the 3rd National Congress of the Lao People's Revolutionary Party, was elected at the 1st Plenary Session of the 3rd Central Committee in 1982.

Members

References

Specific

Bibliography
Articles:
 

3rd Secretariat of the Lao People's Revolutionary Party
1982 establishments in Laos
1986 disestablishments in Laos